Leonid Pavlovich Potapov (6 July 1905 – 9 October 2000) was a 20th-century ethnographer specialising in the study of peoples of southern Siberia.

Early life and education
Leonid Potapov was born in the Altai city of Barnaul. From his early years Potapov showed interest to ethnography of his native land, travelling to study the culture of Altaians with a known Altaist Andrey V. Anokhin. He visited Alatai in 1925 to gather ethnographic material on behalf of the Russian Geographical Society. He graduated from the geographical department of the Leningrad State University with a major in ethnography in 1928. Here he had studied with Lev Sternberg,  Vladimir Bogoraz,  Dmitrii Zelenin, Sergei Rudenko. Alexander Samoylovich, and Sergey Malov tutored him in Türkic languages.

Career
Following his graduation Potapov was appointed a head of scientific department in an Uzbek research institute, leading ethnographic expeditions to various areas of Uzbekistan.

Doctor of Historical sciences, professor, "Tuva ASSR Honored Worker of Science", an outstanding researcher of history and culture of Altaians, Shors, Khakases, Tuvinians and other peoples of southern Siberia. He continued to collect material, publishing his first major text Essays on Shoria history in 1931 and continued with his post graduate work at the USSR Academy of Sciences. He accepted Marxism-Leninism and its application to ethnography. After completing his postgraduate study, Potapov headed the Siberia and ethnography department of the State Ethnographical Museum of the USSR peoples in the Kunstkamera and conducted research work at the USSR Academy of Science's History of Material Culture Institute.

In 1939, Potapov gained a PhD in Historical Sciences, presenting the monograph Relicts of primitive-communal system of Altai peoples. By that time Potapov had published about 30 works, including a number of monographs. At the beginning of the World War II Potapov worked on the evacuation of museum valuables, moving with the museum collection to Novosibirsk in 1942. In 1946 he published Altaians and was appointed professor. he then headed the Khakass ethnographic expedition, spending the next 11 years with various expeditions to Altai, Shoria, Khakassia and Tuva. He broadened his research materials on shamanism incorporating non-soviet sources. Potapov focussed on pre-Islam beliefs of peoples of Central Asia, ethnogenesis, ethnographic materials, archival, written and archeological sources.

In 1948 Potapov published "Essays on history of Altaians" (Novosibirsk, 1948), which was awarded with "Stalin" (later renamed State) premium. He contributed to Essays on the USSR history, History of the USSR, the five-volume History of Siberia and published Brief Esasay on culture and a life of Altaians (Gorno-Altaisk, 1948), Brief Essays on history and ethnography of Khakases (17th–19th centuries)  (Abakan, 1952), Origin and formation of Khakass nation (Abakan, 1957), Ethnic Composition and Origin of Altaians (Leningrad, 1969), Essays on native life of Tuvinians (Moscow, 1969).

From 1957 to 1966 the Tuva Archeological  Ethnographical Expedition worked on studies of ethnogenesis and history of Tuvinians. working with A.D. Grach, S.I. Weinstein and V.P. Diakonova, he edited the three-volume Works of Tuva complex archeological ethnographical expedition. Participants wrote a collective monograph "History of Tuva" (Vol. 1). In 1956 Potapov wrote chapters on 'Altaians', 'Khakases', 'Tuvinians' and 'Shors' for the Peoples of Siberia in Nations of the world series, published also in English by the University of Chicago. Potapov participated in the 23rd and 25th congresses of Orientalists, and in the 6th and 7th congresses of anthropologists and ethnographers (Paris, 1960).

Potapov created a scientific school studying the peoples of Siberia, especially the Sayan-Altai region, and prepared 48 PhD in sciences. A special scientific contribution was his work Altai shamanism (1991) with a rich collection of material brought from uncountable field research materials. Potapov joined the names of N.N. Poppe (1970), V.I. Tsintsius (1972), A.N. Kononov (1976), N.A. Baskakov (1980), A.M. Scherbak (1992) who were awarded "PIAK Gold medal" for Altaic studies.

Bibliography 

The extensive bibliographical listing does not attempt to list all of Potapov's works, but only to give a representative sample of the breadth and depth of Potapov's contributions to Türkology and associated sciences.

 "Die Herstellung der Šamanentrommel bei den Šor" // Mitteilungen des Seminars für Orientalische Sprachen zu Berlin Jg. XXXVII. Abt. I Ostasiatische Studien (further - MSOS),  Berlin, 1934,  pp. 53–73. (co-authorship with K. Menges).
 "Materialien zur Volkskunde der Türkvölker des Altaj" // MSOS. Jg. XXXVII. Abt. I Ostasiatische Studien,  Berlin, 1934 (co-authorship with K. Menges) (Rets. Malov S.E" // BV,  1937,  Issue.10 (1936.) pp. 165–168.)
 Volkskundliche Texte Šor Kizi // MSOS, Jg. XXXVII, Abt. I Ostasiatische Studien - S. 73-105 (co-authorship with K. Menges).
 "Essays on  Shoria history", Moscow - Leningrad, 1936. (full text)
 "Traces de conception totemiques chez les Altaïens dans L. Moryensten: L'exposition d'aptiranien" // Revue Arts Asiatiques. 1936. Vol.10. P.199-210.
 Uigur Khanate // History of the USSR,  Vol.1,  Part 4., 1939 (co-author S.V.Kiselyov)
 "Ainu - inhabitants of Southern Sakhalin and Kuriles" // SE, 1946,  No 2, pp. 216–218.
 "Religious and magic functions of shaman tambourines" // Briefs of Ethnography Institute USSR Academy of Sciences. Moscow, 1946. Issue 1, pp. 41 – 45.
 "A ceremony of revival of shaman tambourine among Türkic-speaking tribes of Altai" // Works of Ethnography Institute USSR Academy of Sciences. Vol. 1. Moscow - Leningrad, 1947, ( full text)
 "Ethnic structure of Sagais" // SE,  1947,  No 3, pp. 103–127.
 From trip to Sagais// Briefs of Ethnography Institute USSR Academy of Sciences,  1948,  Issue 4, ( full text)
 Essays on history of Altaians,  Novosibirsk: OGIZ, 1948,  (Stalin/Sate premium of the USSR)
 "Tamburine of Teleut shaman and her figures" // Coll. MAHE, Leningrad, 1949,  ( full text)
 "Heroic epos of Altaians" // SE,  1949,  No 1
 Clothing of Altaians // Coll. MAHE. Moscow - Leningrad, Publishing house USSR Academy of Sciences, 1951 - Issue 13, pp. 5–59. ( full text)
 Brief Essays on history and ethnography of Khakases (XVIII-XIX centuries),  Abakan, 1952,  217 pp.
 "Essay on an ethnogenesis of southern Altaians" // SE,  1952,  No 3 pp.  (Also In Chinese and English)
 Essays on history of Altaians.  Moscow - Leningrad, Publishing house USSR Academy of Sciences, 1953
 Origin and ethnic structure of Koibals // SE,  1953,  No 3
 Application of historico-etnoraphical method in study of Ancient Türkic culture monuments. Reports of the Soviet delegation on 5th International congress of anthropologists and ethnographers. Moscow, 1956,  28 pp.
 An origin and ethnic structure Koibals // SE,  1956,  No 3
 Origin and formation of Khakass nation,  Abakan, 1957
 Samanismus u narodu Sayansko-Altajske vysociny jako historicky pramen // Ceskoslovenska etnografia,  1957. Sv.5, No 2,  S.134-145.
 Z dejin kocovnictvive Stredni Asii // Ceskoslovenska etnografia,  1957. Sv.5, No 2,  S.260-280.
 Zum Problem der Herkunft und Ethnogenese der Koibalen und Motoren // Journal de la Societe Finno-Ugrien. Helsinki, 1957. Vol.59,  P.104.
 "Wolf in ancient national beliefs and omens of Uzbeks" // Briefs of Ethnography Institute USSR Academy of Sciences,  Issue 30, Moscow, 1958, 
 Nova komplexni expedice Institut Ethnografie Akad. Ved SSSR // Ceskoslovenska etnografia,  1958. Sv, 6, N 3
 Samanske bubny Altaiskych narodnosti // Ceskoslovensko etnografia,  1959. Sv.7, No 4
 "Gocebelerin ibtidai cemaat hagatlarinianlatan cok eskibiradet" // Jarich Dergisi. Istanbul, 1960
 "Die Schamanentrommel bei den Altaischen Völkerschaften" // Glabenswelt und Folklore der sibirischen Völker,  Budapest, 1963, S. 223-256.
 Türkic peoples of Southern Siberia in the 6th-8th centuries // History of Siberia. Moscow, 1964,  Vol.1
 "Tuva in Türkic Kaganate" // History of Tuva,  Vol. 1. Moscow, 1964
 Peoples of Southern Siberia in the 6th-8th centuries // History of Siberia,  Vol.1,  Novosibirsk, 1965.
 Ethnonym "Tele" and Altaians // Türkological collection, Moscow: Science, 1966,  ( full text)
 Ethnic history of Kumandins // History, archeology and ethnography of Central Asia. Moscow, 1968 ( full text)
 "Shamans' Drums of Altaic Ethnic Groups" // Popular Beliefs and Folklore Tradition in Siberia,  Budapest, 1968,  pp. 205–234.
 Türkic peoples of Southern Siberia // History of Siberia from most ancient times, Leningrad, 1968,  Vol 1
 Yenisei Kirgiz // History of Siberia from most ancient times, Leningrad, 1968,  Vol 1
 Ethnic structure and origin of Altaians. Historico-ethnographical sketch, Leningrad,: Science, 1969 ( full text  In Russian)
 Semantics of names of shaman tambourines among Altai nations // Soviet Turkology,  Baku, 1970,  No 3
 Tubalars of Mountain Altai // Ethnic history of peoples of Asia. Moscow, 1972 ( full text)
 Tülbers of the Yenisei runic inscriptions // Türkological collection. 1971. Moscow, Science, 1972 ( full text)
 "Aspects of Siberian shamanism study''', Chicago, 1973
 A note to origin of Chelkans-Lebedins // Bronze and Iron Age of Siberia, Ancient Siberia,  Issue 4,  Novosibirsk, "Science",1974 ( full text)
 Altai-Sayan ethnographic parallels to Ancient Türkic sacrificial ceremony of domesticated animals and their historical meaning // Scientific Notes of Mountain Altai Institute,  Gorno-Altaisk, 1974,  Issue 11
 Über den Pferdkult beiden turksprachigen Volkern des Sayan-Altai Gebirges // Abchandlungen und Berichte des Staatlichen Museum fur Volkerkunde Dresden. Berlin, 1975. Bd 34.
 Historical connections of Sayano-Altai peoples with Sakha (Yakuts) // All-Union Türkological conference,  Alma-Ata, 1976 ( full text)
 Signification rituelle du pelage des chevaux chez les populations Sayano-Altaiennen // L'ethnografie (Paris.), 1977,  No 2
 "Problem of Altai shamanism's ancient Türkic origin and dating" // Ethnography of peoples of Altai and Western Siberia,  Novosibirsk, 1978, pp. 3–36
 Mythology of Türkic-speaking peoples // Myths of nations of the world. Moscow, 1982, Vol. 2

 Notes 

 References 
 "Abramzon S. M., Diakonova V. P. "Zum 70. Geburtstag Leonid Pavlovi č Potatapovs" // Jahrbuch des Museums für Völkerkunde zu Leipzig. Band XXXI. Berlin: Akademie-Verlag, 1977. In German
 Article about L.P. Potapov on site "Researchers of Altai"  In Russian
 Article about L.P. Potapov on site of the Russian Academy of Science Museum of Anthropology and Ethnography (MAHE, Kunstkamera)  In Russian
 "Alekseenko E.A. "Closely at far" // Radlov readings 2006: Theses / SPb.,  MAHE of the Russian Academy of Science, 2006, pp. 161-166.  full text  In Russian)
 "Diakonova V.P., Reshetov A. M. "Leonid Pavloviche Potapov" // EO,  2002,  No 2, pp.  125-131  In Russian
 "Kimeev V. М. "Word about the teacher" // Radlov readings 2006: Theses / SPb.,  MAHE of the Russian Academy of Science, 2006, pp. 166–168. ( full text  In Russian)
 "Dagger R.V." L.P" // Radlov readings 2006: Theses / SPb.,  MAHE of the Russian Academy of Science, 2006, pp. 158–161. ( full text  In Russian)
 Leonid Pavlovich Potapov: 90th birthday anniversary /Russian Academy of Science, SPb.,  MAHE of the Russian Academy of Science, 1995,   In Russian
 "Okladnikova E.A." Leonid Pavlovich Potapov // Kunstkamera: Ethnographic writing, 1995. Issue 8-9.   In Russian
 "Pavlinskaya L.R. Leonid Pavlovich Potapov: destiny and time" // Radlov readings 2006: Theses,  SPb., Russian Academy of Science, 2006  ( full text In Russian)
 "Reshetov A. M. "Elder of the ethnographic shop: 90th anniversary of L.P. Potapov's birthday // Courier of Peter's Kunstkamera, 1995, Issue 2-3.   In RussianThis article is a translation of :ru:Потапов, Леонид Павлович''

1905 births
2000 deaths
People from Barnaul
Asian studies
Soviet ethnographers
Honoured Scientists of the Russian Federation
Soviet historians
Russian Turkologists